The Bakersfield Open Invitational was a golf tournament on the PGA Tour that was played at the Bakersfield Country Club in Bakersfield, California in the early 1960s. The inaugural event played as the Bakersfield Open in 1961.

Winners

Former PGA Tour events
Golf in California
Sports in Bakersfield, California